Bob Burkard (March 23, 1922 – May 13, 1992) was an American soccer goalkeeper who earned one cap with the U.S. national team in 1957.  He was also the United States goalkeeper at the 1952 Summer Olympics.

Burkard was selected to the United States Olympic team at the 1952 Summer Olympics. The United States lost its first game, 8-0, to Italy, eliminated the U.S. from the games.  He earned one cap with the United States national team in a July 6, 1957 loss to Canada in a World Cup qualification game.

At the time of the Olympics he played for St. Louis Kutis S.C. and was inducted into the St. Louis Soccer Hall of Fame in 1986.

References

1922 births
1992 deaths
American soccer players
United States men's international soccer players
Olympic soccer players of the United States
Footballers at the 1952 Summer Olympics
St. Louis Kutis players
Soccer players from St. Louis
Association football goalkeepers